The 1925 Muncie Normal Hoosieroons football team was an American football team that represented Muncie State Normal School (later renamed Ball State University) during the 1925 college football season. In its second and final season under head coach Billy Williams, the team compiled a 2–5 record and was outscored by a total of 132 to 58. The team played its home games at Normal Field in Muncie, Indiana.

Schedule

References

Muncie Normal
Ball State Cardinals football seasons
Muncie Normal Hoosieroons football